Hampstead is an unincorporated community in King George County, Virginia, United States.

Hampstead was named after Hampstead, in England.

References

Unincorporated communities in Virginia
Unincorporated communities in King George County, Virginia